The Rio Mulatos-Potosí line is a railway line in Bolivia, containing Cóndor station, the world's ninth highest railway station. It was the world's second (after Ticlio, in Peru) until the completion of the Tanggula railway station on the Qinghai–Tibet Railway in the Tanggula Mountains, Tibet.

See also

Rail transport in Bolivia

Mountain railways
Metre gauge railways in Bolivia